Feyzabad (also Romanized as Feyzābād and Feyẕābād; also known as Faizābād) is a village in Siyavashan Rural District, in the Central District of Ashtian County, Markazi Province, Iran. At the 2006 census, its population was 697, in 155 families.

References 

Populated places in Ashtian County